Shire of South Gippsland may refer to one of two local government entities in the Australian state of Victoria:
 South Gippsland Shire, created in 1994 and based in Leongatha
 Shire of South Gippsland (former), in existence until 1994 and based in Foster, covering a much smaller area than its modern equivalent

See also
 South Gippsland (disambiguation)